Barry French may refer to:
 Barry French (American football)
 Barry French (scientist)